Mudigonda Lingamurthy, shortly Lingamurthy (Telugu: ముదిగొండ లింగమూర్తి) (10 October 1908 – 24 January 1980), was an Indian film character actor known for his works in Telugu cinema and theater.

Life sketch
Mudigonda Lingamurthy was born to a Hindu Shaiva family in Tenali, Andhra Pradesh. He used to play in school dramas in his childhood. He was very fond of arts and was introduced to Sthanam Narasimha Rao, a Telugu theater artist and a Padma Shri awardee. He joined Rama Vilasa Sabha of Tenali where he portrayed different characters in Kanyasulkam, Pratapa Rudreeyam and other dramas. He acted as Ramappa Pantulu character in Kanyasulkam drama.

He moved to filmdom in 1937 and acted in the movie Tukaram along with V. Nagayya. He later joined Vijaya Vauhini Studios and was associated with them for about 7 years and acted as Ajamisa in Bhakta Potana, Gangadu in Swarga Seema, Abirama in Yogi Vemana and Ramadas in Peddamanushulu. He was closely associated with V. Nagayya and acted in his films like Tyagayya, Naa Illu and Ramadasu. In total Lingamurthy acted in about 70 films.

Lingamurthy wrote some playlets including Venkanna Kapuram, Pelli Choopulu, Thyagam. 

He was founder member of Cine Technicians Association. He also held the post of Secretary and Chairperson of the Association. He retired from the profession after his Sashtiabdhapoorthi celebrations.

After the death of his wife, Durgavardhanamma in 1974, he took Sanyasa as is custom in Indian families. He died in 1980.

A mini hall named after him still exists today at the place where he lived in Nana Street, T. Nagar, Chennai.

Filmography

This is partial list of his films. Please help expand the list.

References

External links
 

Telugu male actors
1908 births
1980 deaths
20th-century Indian male actors
Male actors in Telugu cinema
Male actors in Telugu theatre
Male actors in Kannada cinema
Indian male film actors
Indian male stage actors
People from Tenali
Male actors from Andhra Pradesh